Giovanni Baldelli (1914–1986) was an Italian anarchist theorist, best known for his 1971 work Social Anarchism which defines social anarchism and provides a framework for its introduction.

Baldelli also wrote poetry, plays and philosophical works. Published poetry includes the collections Quand l'aube se survit, Chair à étoiles, Proses et poèmes and Le pied à l’étrier, all in French; Itinerario and All'ombra del gufo, both in Italian; and Seven Fugues, in English.

Notes

Further reading
 David Wieck, "Giovanni Baldelli (1914-1986)," Remembrance, Social Anarchism (A journal for theory and practice), No. 12 (1986–87), pp. 38–43. obituary. http://www.socialanarchism.org/mod/magazine/display/126/index.php
 Nicolas Walter, Letter, Social Anarchism (A journal of theory and practice) No. 14 (1989), pp. 118–119. Letters. "Remarks on David Weick's obituary of Giovanni Baldelli in Social Anarchism 12 (1986-87)," pp. 38–43. http://www.socialanarchism.org/mod/magazine/display/126/index.php

External links

1914 births
1986 deaths
Anarchist theorists
Italian anarchists
Anarcho-communists
Social anarchists